The Congregation for the Evangelization of Peoples was a congregation of the Roman Curia of the Catholic Church in Rome, responsible for missionary work and related activities. It is also known by its former title, the Sacred Congregation for the Propagation of the Faith, or simply the Propaganda Fide. On 5 June 2022, it was merged with the Pontifical Council for Promoting the New Evangelization into the Dicastery for Evangelization.

In principle it was responsible for pre-diocesan missionary jurisdictions (of the Latin rite): Mission sui iuris, Apostolic prefecture (neither entitled to a titular bishop) Apostolic vicariate; equivalents of other rites (e.g. Apostolic exarchate) are in the sway of the Congregation for the Oriental Churches. However many former missionary jurisdictions - mainly in the Third World - remain, after promotion to diocese of (Metropolitan) Archdiocese, under the Propaganda Fide instead of the normally competent Congregation for Bishops, notably in countries/regions where the Catholic church is too poor/small (as in most African countries) to aspire self-sufficiency and/or local authorities hostile to Catholic/Christian/any (organized) faith.

It was founded by Pope Gregory XV in 1622 to arrange missionary work on behalf of the various religious institutions, and in 1627 Pope Urban VIII established within it a training college for missionaries, the Pontificio Collegio Urbano de Propaganda Fide. When Pope Paul VI reorganized and adjusted the tasks of the Roman Curia with the publication of Regimini Ecclesiae Universae 15 August 1967, the name of the congregation was changed to the Congregation for the Evangelization of Peoples.

The early congregation was established in the Palazzo Ferratini, donated by Spanish cleric Juan Bautista Vives, to the south of the Piazza di Spagna. Two of the foremost artistic figures of Baroque Rome were involved in the development of the architectural complex; the sculptor and architect Gianlorenzo Bernini and the architect Francesco Borromini.

The last Prefect of the Congregation was Cardinal Luis Antonio Tagle appointed December 2019 until June 2022. The current Secretary was Archbishop Protase Rugambwa.  The current Adjunct Secretary (and President of the Pontifical Mission Societies) was Archbishop Giampietro Del Toso The Under-Secretary was Father Ryszard Szmydki, O.M.I. The Archivist of the Archives of the Congregation was Monsignor Luis Manuel Cuña Ramos. Monsignors Lorenzo Piva and Camillus Nimalan Johnpillai assisted as Office Heads of the Congregation.

History 

Founded in 1622 by Pope Gregory XV with the bull Inscrutabili Divinae, the body was charged with fostering the spread of Catholicism and with the regulation of Catholic ecclesiastical affairs in non-Catholic countries. The intrinsic importance of its duties and the extraordinary extent of its authority and of the territory under its jurisdiction caused the Cardinal Prefect of Propaganda to be known as the "red pope".

There had already been a less formally instituted committee of cardinals concerned with propaganda fide since the time of Pope Gregory XIII (1572–1585). They were especially charged with promoting the union with Rome of the long-established eastern Christian communities: Slavs, Greeks, Syrians, Egyptians, and Abyssinians. This was the traditional direction for the evangelization efforts of the Catholic Church. Catechisms were printed in many languages and seminarians sent to places as far as Malabar. The most concrete result was the union with Rome of the Ruthenian Catholic communion, most concentrated in modern-day Ukraine and Belarus; the union was formalized at Brest in 1596.

The death of Pope Gregory XV the following year did not interrupt the organization, because Cardinal Barberini, one of the original thirteen members of the congregation, became the next pope as Urban VIII (1623–1644). Under Urban VIII, a central seminary, the Collegium Urbanum, was established to train missionaries. The Congregation also operated Polyglotta, a printing press in Rome, printing catechisms in many languages. Their procurators were especially active in China from 1705, moving between Macau and Canton before finally settling in Hong Kong in 1842.

In strongly Protestant areas, the Congregation's activities were considered subversive: the first missionary to be killed was in Grisons, Switzerland, in April 1622, before the papal bull authorizing its creation had been disseminated. In Ireland after Catholic emancipation (1829) while the established church was still the Protestant Church of Ireland, the Irish Catholic church came under the control of the Congregation in 1833, and soon reformed itself with a devotional revolution under Cardinal Cullen.

These "Cardinals in General Congregation" met weekly, keeping their records in Latin until 1657, then in Italian. The minutes are available in microfilm (filling 84 reels) at large libraries. In the course of their work, the Propaganda fide missionaries accumulated the objects now in the Vatican Museum's Ethnological Missionary Museum.

The Holy See removed the United States from the jurisdiction of Propaganda Fide as mission territory in 1908, along with England, the Netherlands, Luxembourg, and Canada.

With the publiccation of Pope Paul VI's Regimini Ecclesiae Universae on 15 August 1967, the  Roman Curia was reorganized and the name of the congregation was changed to the Congregation for the Evangelization of Peoples.

In 2014 Sr. Luzia Premoli, superior general of the Combonian Missionary Sisters, was appointed a member of the Congregation for the Evangelization of Peoples, the first woman to be appointed a member of a Roman curial congregation.

Purposes 
The Sacred Congregation for the Propagation of the Faith was established in 1622 due to the realization that the governmental structure of the episcopal structure and the decretal law was not possible. Episcopal structure and the Decretal law was government as described in the New Testament. In this new structure, missionaries would be given orders from Rome, and administrative power would be traded over to those who were titled bishops. The Sacred Congregation for the Propagation of the Faith was left in charge to give faculties to the aforementioned bishops in addition to perfects, who were similar to bishops without the notoriety.

A congregation for the propagation of the faith.

On January 6, 1622 Gregory XV erected the Congregation de Propaganda Fide as central and supreme organ for the propagation of the faith to aim at the union of the Orthodox and Protestant Churches and to promote and organize the mission among non-Christians. The goal of this was to regulate missionary work through structural accountability. According to Fernando Cardinal Filoni, “The Congregation for the Evangelization of Peoples has jurisdiction over 186 archdioceses, 785 dioceses, 82 vicariates apostolic, 39 prefectures apostolic, 4 apostolic administrations, 6 missiones sui iuris, 1 territorial abbacy, and 6 military ordinariates,” in today’s modern organization. The Congregation has jurisdiction over missions in Asia, Africa, Latin America, the Caribbean and North America. The church overall has many statues and regulations in place for the overseen congregations so that they may determine the appropriate way to hold mass, perform the sacraments and spread the gospel in difficult or challenging settings.

Procurement of financial support

During Clement VIII’s reign, in the sixteenth century, the second purpose for the Sacred Congregation for the Propagation of the Faith (CPF) was for the organization to procure financial support for their missions – both in domestic and international territory. Each territory would have procurators, where these individuals would ensure that mail, funds, and merchandise could be sent via any route, and Swedish, Danish, and English ships were preferred for their reliability. Most of CPF missions were run and funded by religious orders which were affiliated with this organization, but they were financially independent, like the French MEP and Italian Barnabites; and on the other hand, other income came from land properties, real estate, and commercial rentals in Rome and the Pontifical States, and also inheritance and donations from benefactors – from within in Italy and abroad. Currently, these efforts are the ways in which CPF obtains funds for the mission, however, the World Mission Sunday is the main resource of collection for financial support for this organization.

The establishment of a seminary for the training of missionaries.

The Pontificio Collegio Urbano de Propaganda Fide (Pontifical Urban College for the Propagation of the Faith) was established in 1627 by Pope Urban VIII for the purpose of training missionaries. It was located at the former Palazzo Ferratini at the Piazza di Spagna. The college prepared students for holy orders, after which they were to return to their homelands as missionaries. In 1641 Urban VIII placed it directly under the Congregation for the Propagation of the Faith.

In 1931 the new Pontifical Urban University opened on the Janiculum. The Collegio Urbano de Propaganda Fide relocated from the Palazzo di Propaganda Fide to the renovated former hospital of Santa Maria della Pietà, also on the Janiculum, and serves as a residence for seminarians studying at the Urbania.  

The establishment of a printing press to provide literature for missions.
	The congregation needed to mass-produce literature for their missions so they established their own printing press four years after their founding in 1626 (New Catholic Encyclopedia 11, 751). The press contributed it literature to the Collegium Urbanum as well as to missionaries traveling cross-country to territories that the Vatican entrusted them. The press was originally called Polyglotta, and was intended to print Catholic literature in the various native languages that CPF missionaries would encounter. The press faced significant challenges when most of the equipment and machinery they used to print books was stolen and destroyed during the invasion of Rome in the Napoleonic Wars, 1809 (New Catholic Encyclopedia 11, 751). Later in 1926, the Polyglotta Press was absorbed by the Vatican Printing Press under the leadership of Pope Pius X.

Palazzo di Propaganda Fide

The Congregation was originally housed in a small palace, the Palazzo Ferratini, donated by the Spanish priest Vives. The building is located in the Rione Colonna, at the southern end of Piazza di Spagna. The architectural complex of the Propaganda Fide was developed in the triangular urban block between the Via Due Macelli and the Via del Collegio di Propaganda Fide, two streets which diverged from the piazza.

In 1634 a small oval chapel was built according to designs by Bernini. In 1642, Father Valerio, with Bernini, redesigned the façade to the Piazza di Spagna, and the development was continued along the Via Due Macelli by Gaspare de’Vecchio from 1639–1645.

In 1648, Borromini took over and made various proposals that included demolishing Bernini’s chapel, which must have been particularly galling for the latter as he could see the building from his house on Via Mercede. The Re Magi chapel, dedicated to the Three Kings, has a plan with four side chapels and galleries above. The wall pilasters are continued in the vault as ribs that criss-cross and unite the space, unlike his design at the Oratory of Philip Neri Oratorio dei Filippini where the ribs are interrupted by the oval fresco at the centre of the vault. The criss-cross arrangement in the Re Magi Chapel is such that an octagon is formed at the centre, embellished with a Dove of the Holy Spirit bathed in golden rays.

The central door leads into the courtyard where Borromini intended a curved arcade but this was not built. Only the left hand side of the façade relates to the chapel and the right to the stair and entrance to the College.

Other parts of the College have further minor works by Borromini.

Officials

Prefects 

The prefect is ex officio President of the Interdicasterial Commission for Consecrated Religious and Grand Chancellor of the Pontifical Urbaniana University.

Secretaries 
The secretary assists the cardinal-prefect in the day-to-day running of the congregation and is always an archbishop. They usually go on to hold a position in the Roman Curia that brings them membership to the College of Cardinals.

Adjunct Secretaries 
The adjunct secretary, when one is appointed, is concurrently President of the Pontifical Mission Societies.

Albert Malcolm Ranjith Patabendige Don (1 October 2001 – 2005.12.10) 
Henryk Hoser, S.A.C. (22 January 2005 – 24 May 2008) 
Piergiuseppe Vacchelli (24 May 2008 – 26 June 2012)
Giampietro Del Toso (9 November 2017 – )

Undersecretary 
 Charles Asa Schleck (1995–2000)

Delegate of the Administration 
 Msgr. Angelo Mottola (Italy; later Archbishop) (1986 – 1999.07.16)

See also 

 Pontifical Urban University
 Protectorate of missions

References

Further reading 

 
 Notre Dame University site gives history of the Propaganda Fide, with details of its organization

External links 

Official Propaganda Fide website
GCatholic.org
the Collegio di Propaganda Fide: photos and history
 Satellite Photo. The Collegio is the large rhomboidal block buildings that lie just south of the Spanish steps (narrow tip and Bernini facade facing northeast to Piazza di Spagna).

 
Religious organisations based in Italy
Religious organizations established in the 1620s
1622 establishments in the Papal States
Catholic organizations established in the 17th century